Steve Kennedy (born October 30, 1965) is an American pickleball instructor and former professional tennis player.

Born in Fort Lauderdale, Kennedy played collegiate tennis for Lander University and was named the 1985 NAIA Rookie of the Year. He had a best ranking in professional tennis of 208 in the world and qualified for the main draw of the 1987 US Open, where he lost his first round match in four sets to Eric Winogradsky.

References

External links
 
 

1965 births
Living people
American male tennis players
Pickleball
Lander University alumni
College men's tennis players in the United States
Tennis people from Florida
Sportspeople from Fort Lauderdale, Florida